DSP Dev is an Indian Punjabi-language action film directed by Mandeep Benipal. Co-produced by Dreamreality Movies and White Hill Studios; it stars Dev Kharoud, Mehreen Pirzada, and Manav Vij in lead roles. Dev Kharoud plays an honest cop Dev Sher Gill.

The film was released worldwide on 5 July 2019.

Cast
Dev Kharoud as DSP Dev Shergill
Mehreen Pirzada as Kirat
Manav Vij as Rana Brar
 Fateh Gill
Girija Shankar as MLA Bakhtaawar Brar
Aman Dhaliwal as SI Paramveer
Sukhwinder Raj as ASI Aman Singh 
Shavinder Mahal as DSP Balveer Shergill
Deep Sehgal as Meet
Tarsem Paul as Kirat's father
Sanju Solanki as a journalist
Lakha Lehri as Inspector Lakhwinder Singh
Pardeep Cheema 
Hashneen Chauhan
Sukh Patraan
Mahabir Bhullar
Baljinder Darapuri as Opposite Leader
Sahib Singh as Dev's senior office

Soundtrack 

The soundtrack is composed by Gurmeet Singh, Laddi Gill and lyrics were by Happy Raikoti, and Gill Raunta. The songs are sung by Nachattar Gill, Mannat Noor, Himmat Sandhu and Kamal Khan.

Reception

References

External links 
 
 

2019 films
Punjabi-language Indian films
2010s Punjabi-language films
Indian police films
Fictional portrayals of the Punjab Police (India)
Films scored by Gurmeet Singh
Films scored by Laddi Gill